Agromyza frontella, the alfalfa blotch leafminer, is a species of leaf miner flies in the family Agromyzidae.
Larval instars of this species engage in cannibalism.

References

Agromyzidae
Articles created by Qbugbot
Insects described in 1874